Viruses is a monthly peer-reviewed open access scientific journal published by MDPI covering all aspects of virology. It was established in 2009. The editor-in-chief is Eric O. Freed (National Cancer Institute). The journal is associated with the American Society for Virology, Australasian Virology Society, Brazilian Society for Virology, Canadian Society for Virology, German Society for Virology, Italian Society for Virology, Spanish Society for Virology, and Swedish Society for Virology.

Abstracting and indexing
The journal is abstracted and indexed in:

According to the Journal Citation Reports, the journal has a 2021 impact factor of 5.818, ranking it 10th out of 36 journals in the category "Virology". It has a Scopus CiteScore of 6.3 for 2021, ranking it 77/288 in "Infectious Diseases".

References

External links

Open access journals
MDPI academic journals
English-language journals
Monthly journals
Publications established in 2009
Microbiology journals